Mamaroneck United Methodist Church is a historic Methodist church located at 546 East Boston Post Road in Mamaroneck, Westchester County, New York.  It was built in 1859 and is a one-story, Gothic Revival style building of wood-frame construction with a gable roof. It is rectangular in form with a rear, two story, transecting wing built in 1869.  It features a semi-engaged central tower flanked by stylized buttresses and topped by an octagonal spire.

It was added to the National Register of Historic Places in 1992.

See also
National Register of Historic Places listings in southern Westchester County, New York

References

External links
Mamaroneck United Methodist Church website

Mamaroneck, New York
United Methodist churches in New York (state)
Churches on the National Register of Historic Places in New York (state)
Gothic Revival church buildings in New York (state)
Neoclassical architecture in New York (state)
Churches completed in 1859
19th-century Methodist church buildings in the United States
Churches in Westchester County, New York
Historic districts on the National Register of Historic Places in New York (state)
National Register of Historic Places in Westchester County, New York
Neoclassical church buildings in the United States